The Venus Felix is a sculpture of Venus and her son Cupid which dates back to the 2nd-century AD. It was dedicated by Sallustia and Helpidus to Venus Felix. Its head resembles Faustina the Younger. It is now held at the Pius-Clementine museum of the Vatican Museums, Rome, and is displayed in the Octagon of the Hermes Hall.

Description 

The Venus Felix statue is not a copy but is reminiscent of the great masterpiece, Aphrodite of Cnidus by Praxiteles made in the 4th-century BCE. The statue has a distinctive description on its base which indicates its votive purpose.

The description is thought to attest the statue is dedicated to Venus Felix by Sallustia, a matron whose portrait can be traced back to the 2nd-century AD, and by Helpidus in all likelihood, who stands next to her in the guise of Eros as he hands her an object which could be a mirror.

References

Felix
Sculptures of the Vatican Museums
Sculptures of women
Sculptures of children
Sculptures of Cupid